James Patrick O'Reilly (born 12 November 1994) is a New Zealand rugby union player who plays for the  in the Super Rugby competition.  His position of choice is hooker.

References 

New Zealand rugby union players
1994 births
Living people
Rugby union hookers
Wellington rugby union players
Bay of Plenty rugby union players
Hurricanes (rugby union) players